Samuel Stone (1602–1663) was a Puritan minister.

Samuel Stone may also refer to:
 Samuel J. Stone (1887–1981), micro philanthropist
 Samuel John Stone (1839–1900), Anglican minister and hymnwriter
 Samuel Hanson Stone (1849–1909), American politician
 Samuel M. Stone, president of Colt's Manufacturing